William Keith Bennett (February 23, 1931 – June 18, 1995) was a Canadian football player who played for the Calgary Stampeders and BC Lions. He junior football in Vancouver for the Junior Blue Bombers. He later moved to Dawson Creek, British Columbia and died in 1995.

References

1931 births
BC Lions players
Calgary Stampeders players
Sportspeople from Flin Flon
Players of Canadian football from Manitoba
Canadian football running backs
1995 deaths